Mossy Doyle (born 16 May 1903, date of death unknown) was an Irish boxer. He competed in the men's featherweight event at the 1924 Summer Olympics. At the 1924 Summer Olympics, he lost to Jackie Fields of the United States.

References

External links
 

1903 births
Year of death missing
Irish male boxers
Olympic boxers of Ireland
Boxers at the 1924 Summer Olympics
Place of birth missing
Featherweight boxers